Russell Perry Mace (May 14, 1820 in Boston, Massachusetts – April 24, 1894 in Madera, California) served as a member of the 1865–1869 California State Assembly, representing the 4th District. Mace was a veteran of the Mexican–American War and later moved to California during the California Gold Rush.

References

1820 births
1894 deaths
American military personnel of the Mexican–American War
Members of the California State Assembly
People of the California Gold Rush
19th-century American politicians